Buzi River may refer to:

 Buzi River (Mozambique)
 Buzi River (Taiwan)